Mangon is a surname literally meaning butcher in Walloon language. Notable people with the surname include:

 Johannes Mangon ( 1525–1578), Francophone Belgian composer
 Hervé Mangon (1821–1888), French politician and engineer

See also

Occupational surnames